1844 in sports describes the year's events in world sport.

Boxing
Events
 Ben Caunt and Tom Hyer retain the Championships of England and the United States respectively but there is no record of any fights involving either of them in 1844.

Cricket
Events
 First ever international cricket match, between Canada and the United States, takes place at St George's Cricket Club in New York.
England
 Most runs – Fuller Pilch 517 @ 17.82 (HS 50)
 Most wickets – William Hillyer 142 @ 11.98 (BB 7–41)

Horse racing
England
 Grand National – Discount
 1,000 Guineas Stakes – Sorella 
 2,000 Guineas Stakes – The Ugly Buck
 The Derby – Orlando
 The Oaks – The Princess 
 St. Leger Stakes – Faugh-a-Ballagh

Lacrosse
Events
 Montreal's Olympic Club organises a team specifically to play a match against an indigenous team

Rowing
The Boat Race
 The Oxford and Cambridge Boat Race is not held this year

References

 
Sports by year